Zara Bolton born Zara Bonner Davis (1914–1994) was a British-born Irish golfer. She was the Curtis Cup team captain three times leading the team to victory in 1956.

Life 
Bolton moved to Portrush in 1939 after she married. She had visited the Royal Portrush golf club to compete in the British Ladies Amateur Championship and she married an Irish golfer. She had been a member of the Bishop Stortford Golf club before then and an English International based in London. Her husband, Dr Sloane Bolton, lived at Strandmore House, which had one time hosted John F. Kennedy for tea, and that became their home.

Bolton captained the team which won the Curtis Cup at Prince's Golf Club in Kent in 1956. She was the Curtis Cup team captain three times as she again led the team in 1966 and 1968. The 1966 contest was in America and the 1968 event was in Northern Ireland.

Bolton was captain and president of the Royal Portrees Ladies' Branch. A Zara Bolton Scratch Cup had been competed for since 1986.

Legacy 
In 2012, the Royal Portrush Golf Club announced a new 36-hole event that would be open to both men and women. The women's cup was named the Zara Bolton Cup in recognition of Bolton as a leading Irish amateur player.

Team appearances
Women's Home Internationals (representing England): 1939, 1948 (winners), 1949 (winners), 1950, 1951, 1955, 1956
Vagliano Trophy (representing Great Britain and Ireland): 1948 (winners)
Curtis Cup (representing Great Britain and Ireland): 1948, 1956 (non-playing captain, winners), 1966 (non-playing captain), 1968 (non-playing captain)

References 

British female golfers
Amateur golfers
1914 births
1994 deaths